Meiling Melançon (born March 3, 1980), also known as Mei Melançon, is an American actress, screenwriter and former fashion model. She has appeared in major feature films as well as indie productions, television shows, and more than one hundred commercials as a model and actress. As of 2014 she is becoming known for work behind the camera in roles such as  screenwriter and producer.

Early life
Meiling Melançon was raised in mainly Japan, Hong Kong and Korea. She is of French, Chinese, and Japanese descent. As a child she traveled throughout Asia and Europe. At the age of five her mother taught her how to play the guitar, and she was later in a children's band called Blossoms. In an interview with Giant Robot editor Eric Nakamura, Mei spoke about her non-traditional strict upbringing. She was not allowed to watch most films and television, only classics and that they were not allowed to listen to popular music due to religious reasons.

Career

Actor 
Melançon started acting in 2003. She was at that time a successful model and was signed to Wilhelmina Modeling Agency.  She appeared on season two of Legends of Tomorrow as "Masako Yamashiro". Melançon also appeared in the final season of The L Word as recurring character "Jamie Chen", as Psylocke in X-Men: The Last Stand, as "Miyu" (Kevin Spacey's assistant) in Shrink, as Lynda in the HK-shot film Irreversi, as Dr. Catherine Ivy in the psychological thriller/horror film Pathology (with Milo Ventimiglia), and as the other "Girl in the Car" along with Maggie Q in Rush Hour 2 when she was still modeling. Melançon also starred as Lotus Long in the short film bio-pic Keye Luke, which premiered at the 2012 Los Angeles Asian Pacific Film Festival and which was Closing Night Film of the inaugural 2013 Seattle Asian American Film Festival. She starred in Blumenthal where she played Scottish actor Brian Cox's niece, and the film made its premiere in 2013 at the Santa Barbara International Film Festival.

Writer, producer, director 
Melançon co-wrote the thriller American Romance in 2014. She has also co-written a short film entitled "Stephany + Me", with Ben Duhl, co-starring Tara Summers, directed by Peter Shanel. She produced and starred in a PSA written by comedian Todd Glass that has been covered by The Huffington Post, Perez Hilton among other news outlets. Melançon has also written articles for Giant Robot Magazine.

Filmography

Film

Television

References

External links
 

1980 births
American film actresses
Living people
American female models
American actresses of Japanese descent
American people of French descent
American actresses of Chinese descent
American film actors of Asian descent
American writers of Asian descent